Krzyżanowice may refer to the following places in Poland:
Krzyżanowice, Lower Silesian Voivodeship (south-west Poland)
Krzyżanowice, Lesser Poland Voivodeship (south Poland)
Krzyżanowice, Masovian Voivodeship (east-central Poland)
Krzyżanowice, Silesian Voivodeship (south Poland)